London Concertante is a chamber ensemble, performing classical chamber music repertoire, along with gypsy and Latin American music such as the tango compositions of Piazzolla. The ensemble is led by artist director and cellist Chris Grist. They perform about a hundred concerts each year.

History 
Founded in 1991, the ensemble performed in the UK and made three tours to Spain in its first few years. In an expanded form, the ensemble performed as an opera orchestra, collaborating with Pegasus Opera, Palace Opera, Music Theatre Kernow and Holland Park Opera. The ensemble also began performing regularly at St. Martin-in-the-Fields, as well as also presenting concerts at the Southbank Centre, Southwark Cathedral, St. James' Piccadilly and Cadogan Hall. The ensemble has since toured to Finland, USA, Germany, Ireland, France, Spain, Holland and Italy.

The ensemble's first album, The Four Seasons, was released in 1995, on its own label. They have since recorded for Harmonia Mundi, Toccata Classics, Chandos and ARC Music.

Recordings 
2020 - Music from the Movies

2020 - Romantic Viennese Waltzes

2009 - Piazzolla and Beyond

2007 - Allegro

2007 - Mendelssohn: Octet & String Symphony No. 10

2006 - Adagio

2006 - English Serenade

2003 - Brahms & Schoenberg: Sextets

2002 - Essential Mozart

2001 - Gypsy Tango Pasion

1997 - Bach Concertos

1995 - The Four Seasons

Repertoire

(Alphabetically by composer) 
J.S.Bach - Brandenburg Concerto No.3

Felix Mendelssohn - Octet for strings

Astor Piazzolla - Oblivion

Arnold Schoenberg - Verklärte Nacht

Antonio Vivaldi - Four Seasons

References

External links

Chamber music groups
Musical groups from London